Alain Bonnet, known as Alain Soral (born 2 October 1958), is a far-right Franco-Swiss ideologue, essayist, filmmaker and actor.

Claiming to have been a member of the French Communist Party in the 1990s, Soral worked for the National Front before leaving in 2009. In 2007, he founded his own political association, Égalité & Réconciliation (Equality and Reconciliation) with former GUD members. At the same time, he also launched a publishing company, KontreKulture, which he uses to publish contemporary controversial authors. Alain Soral is regularly condemned, including a prison sentence in 2019, for defamation, racial or antisemitic injury, incentive to racial hatred, apology of crime against humanity and Holocaust denial.

Life and career 
Soral was born in Aix-les-Bains, Savoie and grew up in the suburbs of Annemasse (department of Haute-Savoie), where he attended a local primary school. When Soral was about 12, his family moved to Meudon la Forêt so that he could go to a private Catholic high school, the Collège Stanislas de Paris. Soral spent two years doing small jobs before being accepted into the École Nationale Supérieure des Beaux-Arts at 20, where he studied for two years. Soral was then taken in by a family of academics, who encouraged him to enroll at the École des Hautes Études en Sciences Sociales, where he attended lectures given by Cornelius Castoriadis.

Following his studies, and working with Hector Obalk and Alexandre Pasche, Soral wrote a book on the sociology of trendiness, Les mouvements de mode expliqués aux parents, as well as a fictionalised autobiography, Le Jour et la nuit ou la vie d'un vaurien. The latter work sold badly, and this led Soral to turn away from writing for a time.

Soral then focused on cinematic techniques, and after 2 promotional films, wrote and directed his first short film, Chouabadaballet, une dispute amoureuse entre deux essuie-glaces. After a stint as a reporter in Zimbabwe, Soral wrote and directed his second short film, Les Rameurs, misère affective et culture physique à Carrière-sur-Seine.

Around that time, Soral had joined the French Communist Party. He became interested in the works of Karl Marx and other Marxist thinkers such as Georg Lukács, Henri Wallon, Lucien Goldmann and Michel Clouscard. He published Sociologie du dragueur ("Sociology of the womaniser"), his most successful sociological essay to date. This book was later turned into a feature-length film, Confession d'un Dragueur in 2001 starring Said Taghmaoui, Thomas Dutronc, Catherine Lachens, François Levantal and Cloe Lambert.

Soral performed in Catherine Breillat's 1996 film Parfait Amour! in the role of Philippe.

He then published another polemical essay, Vers la féminisation? – Démontage d'un complot antidémocratique ("Towards feminisation? – Analysis of an antidemocratic plot"), and spent the following couple of years writing and directing his first full-length movie, Confession d'un dragueur ("Confessions of a womaniser"), which was a commercial and critical failure. Disgusted by what he called "a lynching", Soral gave up cinema altogether and returned to writing. He published Jusqu'où va-t-on descendre? – Abécédaire de la bêtise ambiante ("How far down are we going? – ABC's of ambient stupidity"), followed by Socrate à Saint-Tropez (2003) and Misères du désir (2004).

In 2007, he became part of the central committee of Front National, trying to place social issues and even elements of marxist analysis in the program of the party (historically strongly opposed to Communism); but this proved to misfire as the score of candidate Jean-Marie Le Pen at the 2007 election turned out to be significantly inferior to his 2002 breakthrough as second round finalist. He left the party in 2009.

He has a dysfunctional relationship with his family. According to his sister, they had a tyrannical father and he hasn't spoken to his mother for 20 years after he said he wanted time to reconstruct himself.

Views
Besides the sociological Marxist analysis of the modern-day society, Soral's books tend to focus on seven main themes:
 criticism of communitarianism
 criticism of feminism
 criticism of the media and the society of the spectacle in general
 criticism of consumerism, neoliberal capitalism and what he views as "US imperialism"
 criticism of Zionism and Jewish lobbying
criticism of homosexual activism
 criticism of mainstream vulgarity
 the Arab–Israeli conflict
 the dismantling of Yugoslavia, and possibly of France
 the dismantling of Iraq, Libya, Syria, and Ukraine

Notably, Soral has written:

Soral's analysis of society focuses on what he terms "desire society", promoted by the media and the cult of celebrity. He has especially criticised monthly women's publications, which he believes alter the conscience and relegate women to the status of "objects" (femme-objet).

As part of the debate on "laïcité" in French schools, Soral claimed to prefer the Muslim veil to thong underwear.

Soral defined himself as a Marxist, and claims to have been a member of the French Communist Party in the early 1990s. He declares to have left the PCF because of his opposition to the party's renunciation of revolutionary content. Soral supported left-wing dissident candidate Jean-Pierre Chevènement during the 2002 presidential election.

In 2005, Soral turned to the far-right, joining the National Front's campaign committee; he was given responsibility for social issues and for the suburbs under the authority of Marine Le Pen. Soral's personal journey has led some to compare him with Jacques Doriot, one of the neo-socialists in the early 1930s and Collaborationist under Pétain. He supported the Bloc identitaire's distribution of food in January 2006.

On 18 November 2007, Soral joined the central committee of the National Front, which he left in early 2009 because of some ideas he was in conflict with—especially the "menace of Islam", which he does not believe to be a genuine threat. He considers that this supposed threat is instrumentalized by establishment's interests for the purpose of fostering animosity between social groups to manipulate them within the model of identity politics, possibly resulting in a "clash of civilizations", and of looting other countries—Iraq, Afghanistan, Libya, Syria; he argues that the fundamental values of moderate Islam are perfectly compatible with French moderate Catholic ones.

In 2007, he founded the group Égalité et Réconciliation, a think tank led by the ideas he developed in his books and his numerous video interviews broadcast on the Internet, an innovative mix between social and economic ideas from the Left, and values like family, nation, morality from the Right.

Controversy

Alain Soral and "gay communitarianism"
Alain Soral has denounced communitarianism as a "poison". He has been especially critical of the rise of communitarianism in the gay community, a term that he has sharply criticised, arguing that many homosexuals have nothing to do with Gay Pride ideology. For Soral, Gay Pride involves promotion of the "Gorgeous Guy" model, youth, parties, drag queens, etc., and obscures homosexuality as experienced by older or working-class homosexuals. However, Soral is currently supporting the homosexual community Fistinière directed by French sociologists Brice and Alexis.

The association Act Up rounded on his publisher, Éditions Blanche. Act Up stated that through books like those of Alain Soral or Éric Rémès (himself a homosexual activist and advocate of barebacking), Éditions Blanche spreads negative feelings and even hatred towards homosexuals. Act Up asked the director of publication at Éditions Blanche to stop publishing books by Soral and Rémès, and vandalised Éditions Blanche's offices. The head of Éditions Blanche claimed that members of Act Up physically assaulted his executive assistant, and threatened to press charges. Act Up denied those accusations. No legal action has so far been pursued.

Alain Soral and feminism
In his book Vers la féminisation? Démontage d'un complot antidémocratique, Alain Soral argues that women have always worked (in trade or agriculture, for example), and that housewives were mis-sold the idea of having their own careers by neoliberal capitalists. To him, feminism was invented by rich women and results in poor women working double "8 hours in the home and 8 hours at work" and would be better off just working in the home. Soral distinguishes two types of feminism: that of the "flippées" ("freaked-outs"), and that of the "pétasses" ("bitches"). Soral claims that the most problematic inequality is not between men and women, but between rich and poor, and that feminists, who generally come from the upper classes of society, attempt to distract attention from this struggle.

Accusations of antisemitism

In a report on the television program Complément d'enquête, broadcast on the French television channel France 2 on 20 September 2004 (in its episode devoted to the French comedian Dieudonné M'bala M'bala following the beginning of his radicalization), being interrogated while Dieudonné is visible in the background, nodding in approval, Alain Soral said:

These comments sparked much controversy, and Soral estranged himself from his showbusiness friends like Thierry Ardisson, a French TV host and producer, though they knew each other for more than 25 years. Soral defended his comments some days later on the website oumma.com, claiming that his words had been taken out of context. Antisemitism is the main subject of Soral's book CHUTe! Éloge de la disgrâce ("HUSH! In praise of disgrace"), a semi-autobiographical novel. The title of the book is a play on words: chut means "hush" in French, while chute means "fall" or "downfall".

In a 2005 interview given to the magazine VSD, Soral announced his intellectual support for the equally controversial Dieudonné M'bala M'bala, with whom he worked on the Euro-Palestine list for the European elections of 2004, before his withdrawal led Dieudonné to do likewise.

On 10 February 2005 a criminal court in Paris sentenced Alain Soral to a fine of €10,000 in respect of racist insults against the journalist , for a parody song he sang to the tune of Daniel Balavoine's L'Aziza. During the hearing, Haziza declared that he fell victim to threats and insults on Alain Soral's website after he refused to invite him to one of his television programs. In addition to the fine, the author was to pay 5,000 euros as compensation to Frederic Haziza, 3,000 euros for court expenses and €1,000 for legal expenses to four racism combat organizations.

Condemnation for denial of Holocaust 

On 15 April 2019, after years of regular prosecutions and financial condemnations for his declarations, he was sentenced to a year in prison for Holocaust denial as a result of a drawing published on Egalité et Réconciliation, a parody of a Charlie Hebdo cover which made fun of the Rwandan genocide. Arguing that he was not the author of the drawing, and that the drawing was merely showcasing strong black humor in the same vein as the satirical journal, without actually expressing negationist views, Soral stated that this was a demonstration of the double standard regarding the freedom of speech when it comes to the Jewish community, and of the persecution it entails, therefore validating the "serious" of his struggle, for it means that the powers that be are "taking [him] seriously."

Break-up of Yugoslavia and France
Alain Soral argues that Yugoslavia was dismembered by the United States, which saw an opportunity to gain political ground and influence in South-Eastern Europe by arming Albanian separatist movements in the Serbian province of Kosovo.

Soral further argues that communitarianism in France could have a similar effect, if the French Republic fails to apply 1905 Law of Separation of Church and State, which is enshrined in the French constitution. According to a recent TV interview (Direct 8 / 88 minutes), Alain Soral stated: "Today, no one was surprised to see French presidents, prime ministers and other high French political figures meet elusively with the Jewish representing body every year in Paris, meetings that go against the laws of France and send mixed signals to the Republic."

Soral finished by stating that such a course could only push other minorities to form political religious movements in order to be heard. According to Soral, this would be a step likely to divide France into its various religious communities, which would then weaken the independence of the country.

Bibliography
 Les Mouvements de mode expliqués aux parents, with Hector Obalk and Alexandre Pasche, Éditions Robert Laffont, 1984 (reissued by France Loisirs and Le Livre de Poche)
 Le Jour et la nuit ou la vie d'un vaurien, roman, Calmann-Lévy, 1991 (reissued under the title La vie d'un vaurien, Éditions Blanche, 2001)
 Sociologie du dragueur, Éditions Blanche, 1996
 Vers la féminisation? Démontage d'un complot antidémocratique, Éditions Blanche, 1999
 Jusqu'où va-t-on descendre? Abécédaire de la bêtise ambiante, Éditions Blanche, 2002 (reissued under the title Abécédaire de la bêtise ambiante, Pocket, 2003)
 Socrate à Saint-Tropez: Texticules, Éditions Blanche, 2003
 Misère(s) du désir, Éditions Blanche, 2004
 CHUTe! Éloge de la disgrâce, Éditions Blanche, 2006
 Comprendre l'Empire, Éditions Blanche, 2011, 
 Chroniques d'avant-guerre, Éditions Blanche, 2012, 
 Dialogues désaccordés, combat de Blancs dans un tunnel (e-mail correspondence with journalist Éric Naulleau), 2013, 
 Comprendre l'époque : Pourquoi l'égalité ?, Éditions Kontre Kulture, 2021.

Filmography

Actor
1996 : Parfait Amour! de Catherine Breillat : Philippe
2012 : L'antisémite de Dieudonné

Director
1990 : Chouabadaballet, une dispute amoureuse entre deux essuie-glaces (5 minutes)
1993 : Les Rameurs, misère affective et culture physique à Carrière-sur-Seine (10 minutes)
2001 : Confession d'un dragueur, avec Saïd Taghmaoui et Thomas Dutronc

References

External links

 "Egalité et Réconciliation" – Official site (in French)
 

1958 births
Living people
People from Aix-les-Bains
20th-century French writers
21st-century French writers
20th-century French essayists
French comics writers
Collège Stanislas de Paris alumni
French filmmakers
20th-century French male writers
French male non-fiction writers
National Rally (France) politicians
People convicted of Holocaust denial
French Holocaust deniers